Broadway is a small village in the townland of Grange in southeast County Wexford, Ireland, around  south of Rosslare Strand. The village contains a primary school.

Transport
Bus Éireann route 378 serves Broadway on Fridays only and provides a link to and from Tacumshane and Wexford. Its terminus is at Wexford railway station.

See also
 List of towns and villages in Ireland

References 

Towns and villages in County Wexford